Flourensia pringlei, common name Pringle's tarwort, is a species of flowering plant in the family Asteraceae. It is native to the States of Chihuahua and Durango in northern Mexico, the range extending just barely over the international border into Hidalgo County in southwestern New Mexico.

One plant can produce several flower heads, each on its own flower stalk. Each head contains 13-21 ray florets surrounding 40-50 disc florets.

References

External links
Photo of herbarium specimen at Missouri Botanical Garden, collected in Chihuahua in 1885, isotype of Helianthella pringlei/Flourensia pringlei

Heliantheae
Flora of Mexico
Plants described in 1886
Flora of New Mexico